Mercer may refer to:

Business
 Mercer (car), a defunct American automobile manufacturer (1909–1925)
 Mercer (consulting firm), a large human resources consulting firm headquartered in New York City
 Mercer (occupation), a merchant or trader, more specifically a merchant who deals in textiles (mercery)
 Mercer Pottery Company, a defunct American company
 Mercer Union, an artist-run centre in downtown Toronto, Ontario
 A member of the London guild of the Worshipful Company of Mercers

Education
 Mercer University, a private, coeducational university with its main campus in Macon, Georgia, United States.

People
 Mercer (surname), a list of people with the surname
 Mercer (given name), a list of people so named

Places

United States 
 Fort Mercer, American Revolution fort along the Delaware River in New Jersey
 Mercer, Iowa, an unincorporated community
 Mercer, Maine, a town
 Mercer, Missouri, a city
 Mercer, North Carolina, an unincorporated community
 Mercer, North Dakota, a city
 Mercer, Ohio, an unincorporated community
 Mercer, Pennsylvania, a borough
 Mercer, Tennessee, an unincorporated community
 Mercer, Wisconsin, a town
 Mercer (CDP), Wisconsin, an unincorporated census-designated place
 Mercer Arboretum and Botanic Gardens, Harris County, Texas
 Mercer Arena, Seattle, Washington, a performing arts venue
 Mercer Caverns, Murphys, California
 Mercer County (disambiguation)
 Mercer House (Savannah, Georgia)
 Mercer Island, Washington
 Mercer Lake, West Windsor, New Jersey a man-made lake
 Mercer Museum, a National Historic Landmark in Doylestown, Pennsylvania
 Mercer Oak, a large white oak tree that stood in Princeton Battlefield State Park in Princeton 
 Mercer Township (disambiguation)

Antarctica 
 Mount Mercer (Antarctica)
 Mercer Ice Stream, Marie Byrd Land
 Mercer Ridge, Marie Byrd Land
 Mercer Lake (Antarctica), West Antarctica

Elsewhere 
 Mercer, New Zealand, a village
 Mercer Bay, South Georgia Island
 Mercer 3, a globular cluster of the Milky Way galaxy

Other uses 
 Mercer's condition
 USS Mercer, two ships
 Mercer (G.I. Joe), a fictional character in the G.I. Joe universe
 Wilbur Mercer, a fictional character in the Philip K. Dick novel Do Androids Dream of Electric Sheep?
 Mercer (The Walking Dead), a fictional character from The Walking Dead

See also
 Mercer and Somerset Railway, a short-lived line of the Pennsylvania Railroad in western New Jersey
 Methicillin-resistant Staphylococcus aureus, or MRSA, sometimes misspelled as "Mercer" or "Mercer's Bacterial Disease"